Pullman is an architectural term for a long, narrow space within a structure. It is most often used to refer to a small, two-wall kitchen ("a pullman kitchen") or, sometimes, a narrow hall.

The word is derived from the narrow kitchens in the dining cars operated on passenger trains by the Pullman Company during the 19th and 20th centuries.

Pullman kitchens are most common in apartments, where space is limited, to minimize the kitchen's impact on living spaces.

Architectural elements